The following is a list of the CHUM Chart number-one singles of 1958.

References

1958
Canada chum
1958 in Canadian music